Couleurs Primaires is the debut EP by Parisian duo Paradis released on January 19, 2015 under label Barclay. The album features 3 originally composed tracks by Paradis and 2 remixes by Tim Goldsworthy and Superpitcher.

Track listing
"Garde Le Pour Toi" (6:47)
"Sur Une Chanson En Français" (5:14)
"Le Bal Des Oubliés" (6:10)
"Garde Le Pour Toi" (Thee Loving Hand Mix Parts I + II) (18:49)
"Sur Une Chanson En Français" (Superpitcher Remix) (14:19)

References

2015 EPs
House music EPs